The 11th Pan American Games were held in Havana, Cuba from August 2 to August 18, 1991.

Medals

Silver

Men's 3,000 m Steeplechase: Ricardo Vera

Results by event

Athletics
Claudia Acerenza 
Soledad Acerenza 
Estela Abel 
Waldemar Cotelo  
Inés Justet  
Margarita Martirena  
Ricardo Vera

Basketball

Men's team competition
Preliminary round (group B)
Lost to Brazil (72-94)
Defeated Canada (62-61)
Lost to Puerto Rico (78-98)
Lost to Mexico (71-74)
Quarterfinals
Lost to United States (68-114)
Classification Matches
5th/8th place: Lost to Venezuela (79-85)
7th/8th place: Lost to Argentina (71-63) → 8th place
Team roster
Alejandro Costa
Juan Blanc
Jeffrey Granger
Marcelo Capalbo
Gustavo Sczygielski
Javier Guerra
Luis Larrosa
Hebert Núñez
Horacio Perdomo
Alvaro Tito
Daniel Koster
Enrique Tucuna
Head coach: Javier Espíndola

Swimming
Sergio Butteri  
Serrana Fernández 
Germán de Giobbi 
Javier Golovchenko  
Gustavo Gorriarán 
Alvaro Goyenola  
Erika Graf  
Adriana Islas 
Carlos Scanavino

See also
 Sport in Uruguay
 Uruguay at the 1992 Summer Olympics

References
 Uruguay Olympic Committee

Nations at the 1991 Pan American Games
P
1991